Sandra Soldan (born December 27, 1973 in Niteroi) is an athlete from Brazil, who competes in triathlon.

Soldan competed at the first Olympic triathlon at the 2000 Summer Olympics.  She took eleventh place with a total time of 2:03:19.86. Four years later, Soldan competed at the 2004 Summer Olympics.  This time, she did not finish the competition.

References

External links
 Profile

1973 births
Living people
Brazilian female triathletes
Olympic triathletes of Brazil
Triathletes at the 1999 Pan American Games
Triathletes at the 2000 Summer Olympics
Triathletes at the 2003 Pan American Games
Triathletes at the 2004 Summer Olympics
Triathletes at the 2007 Pan American Games
Sportspeople from Niterói
Federal University of Rio de Janeiro alumni
South American Games gold medalists for Brazil
South American Games medalists in triathlon
Competitors at the 2002 South American Games
Pan American Games competitors for Brazil
20th-century Brazilian women
21st-century Brazilian women